A Judas' belt, sometimes called Judah's belt (and spelled as Judas's Belt), is a type of firecracker that produces multiple explosions. It is one of the most popular firecrackers in the Philippines during New Year's Eve celebrations.

Etymology

Known as Sinturón ni Hudas (Tagalog for "Judas' belt," from the Spanish cinturón de Judas). the firecracker's name originates from its use in an old Catholic tradition during Holy Week in Spain and its former colonies, wherein a chain of firecrackers is strapped to a papier mache effigy of Judas Iscariot and then lit up. The explosion then burns the said effigy to ashes. This practice mostly happens during Good Friday and Easter Sunday. Although it is discontinued in the Philippines, the aforementioned practice is still prevalent in Spain and Mexico.

Description

The firecracker consists of a number of small explosives that can be either tubular or triangular in shape, wrapped in thick paper, and arranged sequentially along with a common fuse and a bigger firecracker at the other end. The bigger firecracker at the end is usually a bawang, which essentially a bigger triangulo.

The belt can be laid out on the ground or suspended from something like a tree or wall. The end of the fuse is lit, and as the fuse burns, it ignites each of the explosives with a noise similar to a machine gun.  

A typical belt contains only up to one hundred or more. Its longer counterpart is called sawa, the Tagalog term for python.

Safety 

In the Philippines, Republic Act 7183 was enacted to regulate and to control the sale, distribution, manufacture and use of firecrackers for public safety.  According to the said law. Judas's belt is a legal firecracker although bigger versions of the Judas's belt are banned.

References 

Types of fireworks